Temple Jacob is a small historic synagogue in Michigan's Upper Peninsula. It owes its origins to the copper boom in the Keweenaw Peninsula in the late 19th and early 20th century. The first Jewish synagogue in the Copper Country, it is also the oldest, continuously active Jewish House of Worship in the Upper Peninsula and the only active synagogue in Michigan listed on the National Historic Register as part of the East Hancock Neighborhood Historic District. The synagogue is located near the north end of the lift bridge which connects the two towns of Houghton and Hancock. It was built on land purchased from the Quincy Mining Company and was dedicated in September 1912. The cornerstone inscribes the building in memory of Jacob, son of Israel Gartner, who was a generous contributor and fundraiser. He died shortly before the building was completed.

Builders and structure

Maass Bros. Architects provided the plans and specifications. J.J. Kelly built the temple foundation, which is constructed of Jacobsville sandstone. A. J. Verville completed the superstructure. A vitrified glazed brick was used for the walls.

The hip-roofed structure, which measures 40 feet ×   is topped by a copper dome. "Windows are round-arched, with stained glass that depicts a dove with an olive branch, shofar (ram's horn), burning bush, Noah's ark, hands in blessing, Star of David, eternal light, and the tablets of the Ten Commandments. Inside, the layout of the temple follows normal Jewish customs, with the ark on the east wall. A balcony was once used to separate the men and the women during prayers."

History
The Congregation of Israel was established in 1889, at a time when the Jewish population in the Copper Country was increasing steadily in size. By 1910, at the peak of the copper boom, there were about 100 Jewish families in the Copper Country. By the time the synagogue was completed in 1912, the demand for copper had started to decline; and, with it, the population of the area, including the Jewish population.

Although initially formed as an Orthodox synagogue, Temple Jacob eventually changed to become a Reform synagogue, as did many other small synagogues throughout the U.S. In the 1930s a local businessman and retailer, Norbert Kahn, who had come to the Upper Peninsula from Germany in the mid-1920s and married into the Gartner family, brought a number of his relatives from Germany to escape the hopeless situation of pre-World War II Germany.

Temple Jacob today

Although the Jewish population, like the local population in general, continued to decline through most of the 20th century, new families continued to arrive in small numbers. In recent years an active but small congregation of professionals, academics at Michigan Technological University, recent arrivals of summer visitors, a small continuing local Jewish population, and a group of generous friends have helped to maintain the synagogue and keep Judaism alive in the Copper Country through High Holiday services which are conducted by a visiting student rabbi, Passover Seders, Torah study, Sukkot and Tu BiShvat celebrations and Jewish summer camp scholarships.

References

Synagogues in Michigan
National Register of Historic Places in Houghton County, Michigan
Synagogues on the National Register of Historic Places in Michigan
Synagogues completed in 1912